The Dao or The DAO may refer to:

 The DAO (organization), a particular decentralized autonomous organization created in 2016
 Tao or Dao, a concept in traditional Chinese philosophy and religion

See also
 Dao (disambiguation)
 Tao (disambiguation)